Ivanteyevka is a rural locality (a selo) and the administrative center of Ivanteyevsky District, Saratov Oblast, Russia. Population:

References

Notes

Sources

Rural localities in Saratov Oblast